"Like Someone in Love" is a popular song composed in 1944 by Jimmy Van Heusen, with lyrics by Johnny Burke. It was written (along with "Sleigh Ride in July") for the 1944 film, Belle of the Yukon, where it was sung by Dinah Shore. It was a hit for Bing Crosby in March 1945, reaching number 15, and has since become a jazz standard. In 1993, on Björk’s album Debut, “Debut (Bj%C3%B6rk album)”, a cover of this song was used as the fifth track.

References

Songs with music by Jimmy Van Heusen
Songs with lyrics by Johnny Burke (lyricist)
1944 songs